Igor Vadimovich Shevchenko (born 2 February 1985) is a Russian former footballer. He played as a left midfielder.

Career statistics

Club

Notes

External links
  Player page on the official Luch-Energiya website
 

1985 births
Sportspeople from Samara, Russia
Living people
Russian footballers
Russia under-21 international footballers
PFC Krylia Sovetov Samara players
FC Fakel Voronezh players
FC Anzhi Makhachkala players
FC Luch Vladivostok players
FC Akhmat Grozny players
FC Kuban Krasnodar players
FC Sibir Novosibirsk players
Russian Premier League players
FC Zhemchuzhina Sochi players
FC Torpedo Moscow players
FC Ufa players
FC Arsenal Tula players
Association football midfielders
FC Yenisey Krasnoyarsk players